Ophiomusa is a genus of echinoderms belonging to the family Ophiolepididae that includes: sea urchins, sand dollars and sea cucumbers. Ophiurida are similar to starfish; they both have a central disc and five arms sprouting from the disc. One of the main distinguishing factors of an Ophiuroid is its arms; the arms of an Ophiurida are longer, thinner, and distinctly separated in comparison to those of a sea star.

Description 
Ophiuroids, also known as brittle stars, are relatively small. Brittle stars do not have a brain or eyes, but they do have a stomach, sex organs, and a mouth with five jaws. They have five long, thin, spiny arms made of calcium carbonate plates connected by a central disc; the size of their disk ranges from 6-12mm disc diameter (d.d.), and their arms range from sizes greater than 4 times d.d. in length. The first dorsal arm plates are in the shape of a trapezoid, the next dorsal arm changes to a triangular form and are each separated from each other. Their arms contribute to the star’s “snake-like” movement across the bottom sediments as well as it’s feeding mechanisms. The mouth of a Ophiuroid is located on the oral surface which is facing down but is held off the sea floor. An interesting fact about Ophiuroids is that, like regular sea stars, they have the ability to regenerate a severed arm, they even possess the ability to cut off their own arm if necessary. This is referred to as autotomy (self-cut) which is how it got its name, brittle star. The spiny arms of the brittle star allow the animal to roam without losing grip from the substratum.

Distribution 
Ophiuroids are found through different regions and zones; they have been observed in sea floors in both tropic and polar regions. According to a NOAA dive report, there was a high density ophiuroids across the sedimented seafloor off the North Carolina coast and can also be seen along the Yucatan Peninsula. The genus has almost cosmopolitan distribution, but little is known about them.

Reproduction 
Ophiuroids can reproduce both asexually and sexually, but most reproduce sexually. Asexual reproduction happens when the disc is split in half, this process is called fission. Most species are hermaphrodites, which means that the animal has both male and female sex organs needed to reproduce. Brittle stars release eggs and sperm into the water, the larvae are called Ophioplutei. They settle in the seafloor and eventually form a brittle star. Ophiuroids reach full sexual maturity after about two years and their lifespans can be up to about five years.

Life stages 
When brittle stars sexually reproduce, their fertilized eggs float in the water and eventually develop into larvae. Ophioplutei feed on plankton. Brittle star larvae are small and mostly clear. These larvae then go through metamorphosis, this is the stage where they develop their five arms. These young brittle stars then move on to the settling stage where they sink to the bottom of the ecosystem where they will spend the rest of their life in.

Diet 
Ophiuroids are carnivorous and omnivorous, they use their arms to catch food particles in the water or even food along the seafloor.  Their gut content varied based on where the brittle stars were placed: those living in shallow habitats mainly consumed plankton and macroalgae whereas those living in deep sea habitats mainly consumed brittle star fragments. In an experiment, it was observed that the main contents in six different brittle stars included macroalgae, diatoms, bivalves, gastropods, cyanobacteria, marine fungi, and even unidentified eggs (small organisms, brittle star fragments, and sponges).

Species:

Ophiomusa acufera 
Ophiomusa africana 
Ophiomusa alecto 
Ophiomusa alta 
Ophiomusa anaelisae 
Ophiomusa anisacantha 
Ophiomusa aspera 
Ophiomusa australe 
Ophiomusa binghami 
Ophiomusa biporica 
Ophiomusa breve 
Ophiomusa canaliculata 
Ophiomusa constricta 
Ophiomusa faceta 
Ophiomusa facunda 
Ophiomusa fallax 
Ophiomusa granosa 
Ophiomusa incerta 
Ophiomusa kimblae 
Ophiomusa leptobrachia 
Ophiomusa ligata 
Ophiomusa longispina 
Ophiomusa luetkeni 
Ophiomusa lunare 
Ophiomusa lymani 
Ophiomusa micropora 
Ophiomusa miranda 
Ophiomusa moniliforme 
Ophiomusa morio 
Ophiomusa muta 
Ophiomusa oligoplaca 
Ophiomusa relicta 
Ophiomusa rosacea 
Ophiomusa rugosa 
Ophiomusa scalare 
Ophiomusa simplex 
Ophiomusa stellata 
Ophiomusa testudo 
Ophiomusa tripassalota 
Ophiomusa trychna 
Ophiomusa ultima 
Ophiomusa valdiviae 
Ophiomusa valida 
Ophiomusa zela

References

Ophiuroidea genera
Ophiurida